Lichenase (licheninase, beta-(1->4)-D-glucan 4-glucanohydrolase, 1,3, 1,4-beta-glucan endohydrolase, 1,3, 1,4-beta-glucan 4-glucanohydrolase, 1,3-1,4-beta-D-glucan 4-glucanohydrolase) is an enzyme with systematic name (1->3)-(1->4)-beta-D-glucan 4-glucanohydrolase. It was named after its activity in on lichenin (a form of mixed-linkage glucan).

Activity 
This enzyme catalyses the following chemical reaction

Hydrolysis of β-(1,4)-D-glucosidic linkages in mixed-linkage glucans containing both (1,3)- and (1,4)-bonds

Specificity 
The best-characterised variant of this of enzyme is Bacillus subtilis lichenase, which is used as a molecular biology tool in determining the structure of mixed-linkage glucans. This variant cleaves (1,4) bonds that immediately follow a (1,3) bond.

Other lichenases have different specificities, for example Aspergillus japonicus lichenase cleaves (1,4) bonds that immediately precede a (1,3) bond.

Structure 
Lichenases are from glycoside hydrolase family 16, and share a jellyroll structure. A deep surface cleft acts as the substrate binding site.

References

External links 
 

EC 3.2.1